Bitcoin is a cryptocurrency.

Bitcoin may also refer to:
Bitcoin Foundation, an American nonprofit corporation
Bitcoin Magazine, a magazine specializing in Bitcoin and digital currencies
Bitcoin Core, the actual software that enables sending Bitcoin (the currency) and implements the P2P protocol (also called Bitcoin) and its consensus rules (also called Bitcoin)

See also